The 2016–17 Ethiopian Premier League is the 70th season of top-tier football in Ethiopia as well as the 19th season of the Premier League. The season began play on 12 November 2016. Saint George SC are the defending champions, having won their 25th championship.

The top flight has been expanded to 16-teams up from 14, and is expected to be more competitive and exciting with more matches to play. The bottom three finishers will be relegated to the Ethiopian Super League for 2017-18.

Teams

A total of 16 teams will contest the league, including 12 sides from the 2015–16 season and four promoted from the Ethiopian Higher League. The four newcomers are Fasil Kenema F.C.Jimma Aba Buna F.C., Addis Ababa City F.C. and Woldia City.

Dashen Beer FC and Hadiya Hossana FC were the last two teams of the 2015–16 season and play in the Ethiopian Super League for the 2016-17 season. Saint George SC are the defending champions from the 2015–16 season.

League table

References

Premier League
Premier League
Ethiopian Premier League
Ethiopian Premier League